The MAN NLxx3F is a series of low-floor single-decker city bus chassis between 10.5 to 12.0 metres length, offered by MAN since 1998, with internal code A22. They are based on the integral low-floor MAN NLxx3 Lion's City (A21). Available versions since launch include : NL223F, NL233F, NL243F, NL263F, NL273F, NL283F, NL313F, and NL323F. 
-LPG and CNG versions are also available, with NL313F CNG being the most powerful.

Operators

Europe

Spain
EMT Madrid of Madrid, Spain received a total of 84 CNG-powered NL313F CNGs in 2008. They were bodied by Castrosua and Burillo.

In 2011, five 10.4m NL283Fs and one Hispano Area-bodied NL283F began operating in Santiago de Compostela and Buñol respectively.

Between 2011 and 2012, 13 man NL283F buses came into operation in Tcc Pamplona, of which 4 were bodied by Sunsundegui and the other 9 by Castrosua.

United Kingdom
Wrightbus initially developed a bodywork for the MAN NL273F, called the Wright Meridian. It was the first MAN chassis to be bodied by Wrightbus. A Meridian demonstrator was launched at the Coach & Bus Live 2007, which entered service with Whitelaws. Regal Busways, Newbury Buses and Diamond Bus North West each operate an handful of Wright Meridian-bodied NL273Fs across the United Kingdom.

Asia-Pacific

Singapore

SMRT Buses of Singapore received a 12.0m MCV Evolution-bodied NL323F demonstrator in 2010 for evaluation, registered as SMB138Y. Following a successful trial, SMRT Buses placed a follow-up order of 200 buses through ST Kinetics, the largest order of NL323Fs at that time. These production batch buses were bodied under licence by Gemilang Coachworks with the bodywork design based on the MAN Lion's City Hybrid, and entered service on 2 October 2011. In 2013, SMRT Buses placed an additional order for 202 buses with similar specifications as the first batch of buses, with minor differences in the seating configuration for later buses. A further order of 332 buses was made in 2014, with largely similar specifications as the earlier buses.

As part of the Bus Contracting Model (BCM), some of the buses were transferred to Tower Transit Singapore, Go-Ahead Singapore and SBS Transit under the Sembawang-Yishun, Bulim, Loyang and Seletar Bus Packages respectively. All of these buses have since been repainted into the lush green livery. The last 26 buses to be registered from the order of 332 buses were also painted into the lush green livery prior to entering service.

In October 2016, a MAN NL323F concept bus with 3 doors was exhibited at the Singapore International Transport Congress and Exhibition (SITCE). Marketed as the MAN Lion's City SD 3Dr, it features a modified bodywork design based on the MAN Lion's City Hybrid, built to a low-entry configuration under licence by Gemilang Coachworks. The bus was later painted into the lush green livery and began a 6-month trial service with SMRT Buses from 19 June 2017, starting from bus service 190.

On 27 May 2018, new MAN NL323Fs, with an emission standard of Euro VI entered service with the launch of new Express service 851e. These Euro VI-compliant buses, under new LTA standards, are equipped Passenger Information Display LCD screens (PIDS) and USB charging ports, and are allocated to operators SBS Transit, SMRT Buses, Go-Ahead Singapore and Tower Transit Singapore. With the commencement of the Sembawang-Yishun Bus Package under Tower Transit Singapore on 5th September 2021, they have received a few MAN NL323F Euro VIs from SMRT and LTA storage, making the NL323F Euro VI to be operated by all four operators in Singapore. They are bodied in the MAN Lion's City SD bodywork by Gemilang Coachworks and are painted in the lush green livery under the Bus Contracting Model.

On 5 October 2021, ST Engineering Retrofitted Electric Bus (SG3100M), previously SMB3075A debuted on SMRT Bus Service 176. The bus was taken out of service between October 2017 to October 2018 and was shipped to Turku (Finland), the location of Finnish electric bus manufacturer Linkker’s factory. It retrofitted with the Linkker LinkDrive retrofit kit, a conversion kit based on Linkker’s own electric drivetrain. The main subsystems of the conversion kit are the traction system, battery system, power distribution unit, vehicle control system, charging connectivity system and driver’s workplace upgrade. Linkker conversion kits are also made for other bus types. During its debut on 176, it was spotted without MAN badges and experienced several issues like rolling back on the hilly terrain en-route on Service 176. On top of that, it also experienced Connectivity issues between the Bus Onboard System and the Charging System located at Bukit Panjang Integrated Transport Hub.

South Korea

In March 2017, MAN exhibited a 12.0m Castrosua City Versus bodied MAN NL313F CNG concept bus with 3 doors at the 11th Seoul Motor Show. It was marketed as the MAN Lion's City CNG, despite featuring Castrosua bodywork, which has a different design with the integral MAN Lion's City's body.

Gimpo Trans Co. received the first delivery of NL313F CNG and began service on Gimpo City bus route 1002 in November 2017.

Australia
At Perth Airport, Carbridge operates one imported and rebodied Gemilang Coachworks MAN NL323F from Singapore which was a demonstrator unit as SMB138Y for SMRT Buses with the MCV Evolution bodywork. This unit was displayed at the 2015 BusVic Maintenance Conference in Moonee Valley, Victoria.

Middle East

Israel

Dan Bus Company and Egged operate a fleet of NL313Fs and NL323Fs in Jerusalem, Tel Aviv and Haifa.

References

External links

NLxx3F
Buses of Germany
Bus chassis
Natural gas vehicles
Low-floor buses
Single-deck buses
Vehicles introduced in 1998